Delli Carri is an Italian surname. Notable people with the surname include:

Daniele Delli Carri (born 1971), Italian footballer
Filippo Delli Carri (born 1999), Italian footballer

Italian-language surnames
Compound surnames